Île Amsterdam, also known as Amsterdam Island and New Amsterdam (Nouvelle-Amsterdam), is an island of the French Southern and Antarctic Lands in the southern Indian Ocean that together with neighbouring Île Saint-Paul  to the south forms one of the five districts of the territory.

The research station at Martin-de-Viviès, first called Camp Heurtin and then La Roche Godon, is the only settlement on the island and is the seasonal home to about thirty researchers and staff studying biology, meteorology, and geomagnetics.

History
The first person known to have sighted the island was the Spanish explorer Juan Sebastián de Elcano, on 18 March 1522, during his circumnavigation of the world.  Elcano called it Desesperanza (Despair), because he couldn't find a safe place to land and his crew was desperate for water after 40 days of sailing from Timor. On 17 June 1633, Dutch mariner Anthonie van Diemen sighted the island, and named it after his ship, Nieuw Amsterdam.  The first recorded landing on the island occurred in December 1696, led by the Dutch explorer Willem de Vlamingh.

French mariner Pierre François Péron wrote that he was marooned on the island between 1792 and 1795. Péron's Memoires, in which he describes his experiences, were published in a limited edition, now an expensive collectors' item. However, Île Amsterdam and Île Saint-Paul were often confused at the time, and Péron may have been marooned on Saint-Paul.

Sealers are said to have landed on the island, for the first time, in 1789. Between that date and 1876, 47 sealing vessels are recorded at the island, 9 of which were wrecked. Relics of the sealing era can still be found.

The island was a stop on the Macartney Mission during its voyage to China in 1793.

On 11 October 1833, the British barque Lady Munro was wrecked at the island. Of the 97 persons aboard, 21 survivors were picked up two weeks later by a US sealing schooner, General Jackson.

John Balleny in command of the exploration and sealing vessel Eliza Scott (154 tons) visited the island in November 1838 in search of seals. He returned with a few fish and reported having seen the remains of a hut and the carcass of a whale.

The islands of Île Amsterdam and Île Saint-Paul were first claimed by France in June 1843. A decree of 8 June 1843 mandated the Polish captain Adam Mieroslawski to take into possession and administer in the name of France both islands. The decree as well as the ship's log from the Olympe ship from 1 and 3 July 1843, stating that the  islands had been taken into possession by Mieroslawski, are still preserved.
However, the French government renounced its possession of the islands in 1853.

In January 1871 an attempt to settle the island was made by a party led by Heurtin, a French resident of Réunion. After seven months, their attempts to raise cattle and grow crops were fruitless, and they returned to Réunion, abandoning the cattle on the island.

In May 1880  circumnavigated the island searching for a missing ship the Knowsley Hall. A cutter and gig were despatched to the island to search for signs of habitation. There was also an upturned serviceable boat in the other hut, believed to belong to the fishermen who visited the island.

The island was attached to the French colony of Madagascar from 21 November 1924 until 6 August 1955 when the French Southern and Antarctic Lands was formed. (Madagascar gained independence in 1958.)

The first French base on Île Amsterdam was established in 1949, and was originally called Camp Heurtin. It is now the Martin-de-Viviès research station.

The Global Atmosphere Watch still maintains a presence on Île Amsterdam.

Amateur radio
From 1987 to 1998, there were frequent amateur radio operations from Amsterdam Island. There was a resident radio amateur operator in the 1950s, using callsign FB8ZZ.

In January 2014 Clublog listed Amsterdam and St Paul Islands as the seventh most-wanted DXCC entity. On 25 January 2014 a DX-pedition landed on Amsterdam Island using MV Braveheart and began amateur radio operations from two separate locations using callsign FT5ZM. The DX-pedition remained active until 12 February and achieved over 170,000 two-way contacts with amateur radio stations worldwide.

Environment

Geography
The volcanic island is a potentially active volcano. No historical eruptions are known, although the fresh morphology of the latest volcanism at Dumas Crater on the NE flank suggests it may have occurred as recently as a century ago.

Climate
Under the Trewartha climate classification the island is well inside the maritime subtropical zone due to its very low diurnal temperature variation keeping means high.

Flora and fauna

Vegetation
Phylica arborea trees occur on Amsterdam, which is the only place where they form a low forest, although the trees are also found on Tristan da Cunha and Gough Island. It was called the Grand Bois ("Great Forest"), which covered the lowlands of the island until forest fires set by sealers cleared much of it in 1825. Only eight fragments remain.

Some sailors from HMS Raleigh landed on the island on 27 May 1880. They described the vegetation as

Birds

The island is home to the endemic Amsterdam albatross, which breeds only on the Plateau des Tourbières. Other rare species are the brown skua, Antarctic tern and western rockhopper penguin. The Amsterdam duck is now extinct, as are the local breeding populations of several petrels. There was once possibly a species of rail inhabiting the island, as a specimen was taken in the 1790s (which has been lost), but this was either extinct by 1800 or was a straggler of an extant species. The common waxbill has been introduced.  Both the Plateau des Tourbières and Falaises d'Entrcasteaux have been identified as Important Bird Areas by BirdLife International, the latter for its large breeding colony of Indian yellow-nosed albatrosses.

Mammals
There are no native land mammals. Subantarctic fur seals and southern elephant seals breed on the island. Introduced mammals include the house mouse, brown rat, and feral cats. An eradication campaign of these invasive species was started in 2023.

A distinct breed of wild cattle, Amsterdam Island cattle, also inhabited the island from 1871 to 2010. They originated from the introduction of five animals by Heurtin during his brief attempt at settlement of the island in 1871, and by 1988 had increased to an estimated 2,000. Following recognition that the cattle were damaging the island ecosystems, a fence was built restricting them to the northern part of the island. In 2007 it was decided to eradicate the population of cattle entirely, resulting in the slaughter of the cattle between 2008 and 2010.

See also
 List of volcanoes in French Southern and Antarctic Lands
 French overseas departments and territories
 Administrative divisions of France
 List of French islands in the Indian and Pacific oceans

References

Further reading

External links

 Ile Amsterdam visit (photos from a tourist's recent visit)
 French Colonies—Saint-Paul & Amsterdam Islands, Discover France
 French Southern and Antarctic Lands at the CIA World Factbook
 
 Antipodes of the USA

 
Amsterdam
Volcanoes of the French Southern and Antarctic Lands
Potentially active volcanoes
Seal hunting